The Audi Q3 is a subcompact luxury crossover SUV made by Audi. The Q3 has a transverse-mounted front engine, and entered production in 2011.



First generation (Typ 8U; 2011)

Concept Vehicle: Audi Cross Coupé quattro (2007)

The vehicle was unveiled at the Shanghai Motor Show in April, 2007.

Initial release

Audi Q3 (2011-)

The car uses the Volkswagen Group A (PQ46) platform of the Volkswagen Passat B6, the same as the Volkswagen Tiguan compact SUV. The Q3 slots above the Audi Q2 subcompact crossover SUV. Compared to the compact luxury crossover SUV Q5 and mid-size luxury crossover SUV Q7, which are positioned more for family practicality and off-road performance, the Q3 is aimed as more of a lifestyle/sports automobile. Design and development began following board approval in the second half of 2007. Julian Hoenig's design was chosen for production and frozen in 2009.

The Q3 shares components, transmissions and engines with amongst other vehicles utilising the PQ35 platform, the Volkswagen Golf, Audi A3 and Škoda Yeti.

The vehicle was unveiled at Auto Shanghai 2011.

The vehicles went on sale in June 2011. Early models include 2.0 TFSI quattro (170/211PS), 2.0 TDI (140PS), 2.0 TDI quattro (177PS).

Indian models went on sale in 2012. Early models include 2.0 TDI quattro (177PS).

China models went on sale at the end of July 2012 as an import vehicle. The Changchun-made Audi Q3 entered market in April 2013, which included 35 TFSI (170PS), 35 TFSI quattro (170PS), 40 TFSI quattro (200PS), with 7-speed S Tronic transmissions.

2.0 TDI quattro (140PS) was introduced in 2012 for the UK market.

Audi Q3 Vail (2012)

The vehicle was unveiled in 2012 at the North American International Auto Show. The name Vail comes from the well-known town in the Rocky Mountains of Colorado, United States of the same name. Vail, Colorado has a sponsorship coordination with Audi.

Audi RS Q3 concept (2012)

The vehicle was unveiled in Auto China 2012 in Beijing, and later in 2012 Wörthersee Tour.

Audi Q3 Jinlong Yufeng (2012)

The vehicle was unveiled in Auto China 2012 in Beijing, and later in 2012 Wörthersee Tour.

Audi Q3 red track (2012)

The vehicle was unveiled in 2012 Wörthersee Tour.

Audi RS Q3 (2013-2016)

It is the first production turbo model in a Q-series vehicle; based on the Audi RS Q3 concept.

Infotainment options include MMI Navigation plus, Bose surround sound system with 14 loudspeakers with up to 465 watts of output power, Bluetooth car phone online advanced driver-assistance systems.

Optional styling packages (in matt aluminum or black) include flaps in the side air intakes, the trim on the diffuser, and the fins on the roof spoiler.

The vehicle was unveiled at the 2013 Geneva Motor Show, followed by Wörthersee Tour 2013.

Deliveries of German model began in fall 2013.

Deliveries in the UK started in early 2014.

It will not be available in Canada.

In late September 2015, it was found out that the Volkswagen Group had implanted a defeat device to cheat emission tests.
The Audi Q3 was also listed to be fitted with one such device.

Engines

Transmissions

Safety
Euro NCAP tested the Audi Q3, 5-door Compact SUV with front airbags, side airbags, seatbelt pretensioners and load limiters as standard and scored it accordingly:

Production
On 2011-06-07, Audi announced the production of Audi Q3 began at SEAT factory in Martorell, located in Spain's Catalonia region, with annual production of approximately 100,000 Q3 units. In 1998, the production facility was chosen as the "Best Factory of the VW Group in the first quarter". Production at Martorell began on 2011-07-13 with Spanish Prince Felipe's inauguration at Martorell plant.

The Audi Q3 is built in a FAW-Volkswagen plant in Changchun, China in a joint venture with its partner FAW; production began in 2013. The Changchun-made Audi Q3 first entered the market in April 2013.

Marketing
As part of Audi A3 launch in China, Audi Q3 Trans China Tour 2011 began in 2011-10-15, featuring roughly 160 participants driving Audi Q3 2.0 TFSI quattro S tronic (211PS) in a 16-stage  route starting from Beijing to Shanghai, Shenzhen, Guilin, and ending in Hong Kong. The tour ended with 20 cars arriving at the final destination in Shenzhen near Hong Kong.

As part of Audi A3 launch in Taiwan, more than 11 famous independent bands were invited to present Q3 Urban Music Festival.

As part of RS Q3 launch, Audi Land of quattro Alpen Tour 2013 featured the RS Q3 travelling across twelve driving stages in 6 countries (Klagenfurt – the capital of Carinthia, Austria, Monaco).

2014 update

Audi Q3 (2014–2016)

In 2014 the Audi Q3 received a facelift for the 2015 model year. The grille on the 2015 version has a wider chrome surround to it, which touches the headlights at each side. The lower air vents have been enlarged slightly, and the lights themselves have re-profiled LEDs to give the car a more recognisable look in the dark. The wheel arch surrounds and door sills are body coloured on the base model (they used to be black plastic), as is the rear bumper design, which sits below subtly reshaped lower tail light clusters. Also there are new alloy wheel designs to finish off the refresh.

The changes to the inside are even more difficult to spot than those on the outside. Styling-wise, the only thing of note is a new steering wheel design. There is now the option to specify blind spot and lane departure warning systems if you wish. The boot remains the same volume at 420 litres, expanding to 1,325 litres when the rear seats are folded flat.

Across the range, each engine has seen an improvement in performance, efficiency or both. The 1.4-litre turbo petrol now features cylinder-on-demand technology, which saves fuel by shutting down a couple of cylinders when less power is needed.

The vehicle was unveiled in 2014 North American International Auto Show.

US models went on sale in Fall 2014 as 2015 model year vehicles. Early models included 2.0 TFSI (200 PS), 2.0 TFSI quattro (200 PS).

2015 update

Audi Q3, RS Q3 (2015-)

Changes include redesign of front lights, grille, and exterior fascia; Alu-optic interior MMI controls and interior upgrades, front and rear parking sensors with rearview camera join wide array of standard equipment, full LED headlights and dynamic rear turn signals on Prestige models.

The vehicles went on sale in February 2015, with delivery of RS Q3 began in the first quarter of 2015. Early models included Q3 2.0 TDI clean diesel (110 kW), Q3 2.0 TDI clean diesel ultra (110 kW), Q3 TDI clean diesel quattro (110/135 kW), Q3 1.4 TFSI COD (110 kW), Q3 1.4 TFSI COD ultra (110 kW), Q3 2.0 TFSI quattro (132/162 kW), RS Q3 2.5 TFSI (250 kW).

Early German models included Q3 1.4 TFSI COD (110 kW), Q3 1.4 TFSI COD ultra (110 kW), Q3 2.0 TFSI (132 kW), Q3 2.0 TFSI quattro (132/162 kW), Q3 2.0 TDI (88/110/135 kW), Q3 2.0 TDI ultra (110 kW), Q3 2.0 TDI quattro (110/135 kW). Q3 2.0 TFSI (132 kW), Q3 2.0 TDI (135 kW) were dropped as of 2016.

US and Canada models went on sale as 2016 model year vehicles. Early models included Q3 2.0 TFSI (147 kW), Q3 2.0 TFSI quattro (147 kW).

Audi connected mobility concept (2016)
Developed at Audi Research & Development in Beijing, it is a version of Q3 with an electrically powered multifunctional longboard integrated into the car's rear bumper.

The vehicle was unveiled in Auto China 2016.

RS Q3 performance (2016)

The vehicle was unveiled in 2016 the Geneva Motor Show. Delivery began in the second quarter of 2016.

Engines

Second generation (Typ F3; 2018)

The second-generation Audi Q3, built on the MQB A2 platform was officially unveiled on July 25, 2018. On the Nürburgring race track, a sports version was tested, which would be called SQ3, with an even more powerful version of RS Q3 planned.

A Sportback version was revealed in July 2019. The Q3 Sportback is marginally lower, narrower and longer, with different bumpers, side skirts and body cladding. Aimed at the BMW X2, the lower roofline and raked rear hatch result in less headroom, and 0.14 less cubic meters (5 cubic feet) when the rear seats are folded.

In Europe, a plug-in-hybrid EA211 1.4L turbo four came with the 2021 model year in January 2021 in Germany.

RS Q3 
The RS Q3 variant was revealed in September 2019; it has the same engine as the first-generation RS Q3 albeit with more power.

RS Q3 Edition 10 Years
Announced in October 2022, the Audi RS Q3 Edition 10 Years is a special edition with some visual changes, such as blacked-out trim, and only 555 units will be built.

Safety

References

Notes

Bibliography

 
 Stein, Jason, Audi to build Q5 SUV, Q3 may be next, AutoWeek, February 3, 2006 (URL last accessed October 18, 2006).
 Future Models (2009), Channel 4 News (UK), July 14, 2006 (URL last accessed October 18, 2006).
 2011 Audi Q3, Automobile Magazine, November 1, 2006 (URL last accessed October 18, 2006).

External links

 Audi corporate website

Q3
Cars introduced in 2011
2020s cars
Mini sport utility vehicles
Luxury crossover sport utility vehicles
Front-wheel-drive vehicles
All-wheel-drive vehicles
Euro NCAP small off-road